Perunchithiranar (10 March 1933 – 11 June 1995) was a Tamil poet and Tamil nationalist known for his involvement in the Pure Tamil Movement. He is regarded as the father of the Tamil nation.

Early life
Perunchithiranar was born to Duraisami and Kunchammal in Samuthiram near Salem.

Education 
He did his schooling in Salem and Attur. He went to Salem Municipal College where Devaneya Pavanar worked as Tamil professor.

Career 
He worked for the Thani Tamil Iyakkam (Pure or Independent Tamil Movement). It is a linguistic-purity movement in Tamil literature which attempts to avoid loanwords from Sanskrit. He married Kamalam who was later known as Thamarai Ammaiyar. After his college, he worked in postal department in Puducherry. In 1959, he transferred to Cuddalore where started his Thenmozhi magazine. Perunchiththiranar published over a dozen Tamil books during his lifetime. His book Koyyakani was used as post-graduate text in the 1980s and another book Ayyai was used as undergraduate text in the 1970s at Madras University. He also founded and edited two more magazines, Tamilsittu and Tamil Nilam.

In 1965, he was arrested for anti-Hindi remarks in his magazine. He was a rationalist, which reflected in his writings. He was imprisoned twice after the assassination of Rajiv Gandhi due to his continued support for Tamil Eelam.

References

Tamil poets
Tamil activists
1933 births
1995 deaths
20th-century Indian poets
Indian male poets
Poets from Tamil Nadu
20th-century Indian male writers